Nasrollah Sarvari (1942 – 22 December 2017) was an Afghan painter. His works often deal with historical, philosophical, natural landscapes, and the social life of the villagers. He was familiar with the styles of Romanticism, Realism and Classicism and was a follower of Behzad Heravi's style in miniature art.

Life 
Sarvari was born in Herat and began painting at the age of nine. He was a student of artists such as Khair Mohammad Khan Yari, Karim Shah Khan, Golmohammad Honarjoo, Behzad Saljuqi and Yousef Kohzad and studied art history for many years. Sarvari graduated from Kabul University with a degree in telecommunications. He spent many years of his life in Iran. Sarvari is the founder of the Jihad Landscape Museum in Herat. His works are curated by his nephew, Faridollah Adib Ahein, in the collection "The Azure Road".

Death 
Sarvari died in December 2017. Following his death, the artists pointed out the neglect of artists' lives by the people and the government, noting that the lives and deaths of artists in poverty is one of the consequences.

References 

20th-century painters
Realist painters
Afghan engineers
Kabul University alumni
20th-century male artists
Contemporary painters
Afghan painters
1942 births
2017 deaths